The 13th constituency of the Hauts-de-Seine is a French legislative constituency in the Hauts-de-Seine département.

Description

Hauts-de-Seine's 13th constituency covers the far south of the department.

Historically the constituency has supported the right with the sole exception of the 1981 election. The left remains competitive with its candidate losing by only 191 votes at the 2012 election.

Historic Representative

Election results

2022

 
 
 
 
 
 
 
 
|-
| colspan="8" bgcolor="#E9E9E9"|
|-

2017

 
 
 
 
 
 
 
|-
| colspan="8" bgcolor="#E9E9E9"|
|-

2012

 
 
 
 
 
 
|-
| colspan="8" bgcolor="#E9E9E9"|
|-

2007

 
 
 
 
 
 
 
|-
| colspan="8" bgcolor="#E9E9E9"|
|-

2002

 
 
 
 
 
|-
| colspan="8" bgcolor="#E9E9E9"|
|-

1997

 
 
 
 
 
 
 
 
 
|-
| colspan="8" bgcolor="#E9E9E9"|
|-

Sources

 Official results of French elections from 1998: 

13